Gianluca Brambilla (born 22 August 1987) is an Italian professional road bicycle racer, who currently rides for UCI ProTeam .

Career
He was also a member of the Ormesani Panni and Zalf Desirèe Fior teams as an amateur, winning numerous domestic races. At the 2011 Giro d'Italia, Brambilla finished fourth in the mountains classification as well as taking a fourth place stage finish during Stage 18 to San Pellegrino Terme. Brambilla took two further top-ten places at the 2012 edition of the race, placing tenth on the seventh stage, and seventh on the eighth stage.

In September 2014, Brambilla was ejected from the Vuelta a España during the 16th stage after trading blows with Russian cyclist Ivan Rovny.

In 2016, he won Stage 8 of the Giro d'Italia, which netted him the Pink Jersey. He did so from an early breakaway. In June 2017, he was named in the startlist for the Tour de France.

In February 2021, Brambilla won the Tour des Alpes-Maritimes et du Var stage race. He had done well on the first two stages, managing to keep pace with race leaders, and was well-placed going into the third and final stage in 17th place, but only 13 seconds behind then-race leader Michael Woods. He was a part of the day's main breakaway group of 16 riders. As the breakaway began to disintegrate on the slopes of the last categorized climb, the Col de la Madone, Brambilla attacked, with only Valentin Madouas able to follow. With around 11 kilometers left, he attacked again, and this time Madouas was unable to keep up. Brambilla pushed on over the last climb, the uncategorized Col de Nice, and managed to hold on for the stage win. Despite Woods' best efforts to maintain his lead, he and Brambilla's teammate Bauke Mollema finished in a group 18 seconds behind Brambilla, giving the Italian the overall win.

Major results

2006
 3rd Overall Giro del Veneto
 3rd Stallavena
2007
 Giro del Veneto
1st Stages 1 (TTT) & 4
 1st Memorial Gerry Gasparotto
 2nd Coppa Fiera Mercatale
 2nd Gran Premio dei Colli Isolani
 2nd Gran Premio Ezio Del Rosso
 3rd Memorial Vittime del Vajont 9 Ottobre 1963
 5th Overall Giro del Friuli-Venezia Giulia
 9th Giro del Belvedere
2008
 1st Gran Premio Palio del Recioto
 1st Memorial Vittime del Vajont 9 Ottobre 1963
 2nd Piccola Sanremo
 2nd Giro della Provincia di Padova
 2nd Coppa Città di San Daniele
 3rd Trofeo Zsšdi
 3rd GP Bianco di Custoza
 3rd Coppa Lessinia
 3rd Trento–Monte Bondone
 4th Trofeo Gianfranco Bianchin
 5th Trofeo Banca Popolare di Vicenza
 6th Overall Giro delle Regioni
 9th GP Capodarco
 10th Trofeo Città di San Vendemiano
2009
 1st  Overall Giro del Friuli-Venezia Giulia
 1st Medaglia d'Oro Frare De Nardi
 1st Coppa Città di San Daniele
 2nd Trofeo Gianfranco Bianchin
 2nd Coppa Fiera di Mercatale
 3rd Road race, National Under-23 Road Championships
 3rd Trofeo Zsšdi
 3rd Giro della Valli Aretine
 3rd Ruota d'Oro
 3rd Trofeo Sportivi di Briga
 7th Gran Premio Palio del Recioto
 10th Giro del Medio Brenta
2010
 1st Gran Premio Nobili Rubinetterie
 6th Gran Premio di Lugano
2011
 4th Gran Premio Industria e Commercio Artigianato Carnaghese
 4th Giro della Romagna
 6th Gran Premio dell'Insubria-Lugano
2012
 1st Stage 1b (TTT) Giro di Padania
 2nd Giro dell'Appennino
 4th Trofeo Laigueglia
 4th GP Industria & Artigianato di Larciano
 7th Gran Premio di Lugano
 7th Memorial Marco Pantani
 8th Trofeo Melinda
 10th Giro dell'Emilia
2014
 3rd GP Briek Schotte
 4th Trofeo Serra de Tramuntana
2015
 6th Overall Abu Dhabi Tour
 10th Giro di Lombardia
 10th La Drôme Classic
2016
 1st Trofeo Pollenca–Port de Andratx
 Giro d'Italia
1st Stage 8
Held  after Stages 8–9
 1st Stage 15 Vuelta a España
 2nd Road race, National Road Championships
 3rd Strade Bianche
 4th Trofeo Serra de Tramuntana
 6th Clásica de San Sebastián
 7th Overall Vuelta a Burgos
 8th Tre Valli Varesine
 10th Overall Tour of Oman
2017
 8th Cadel Evans Great Ocean Road Race
 8th Grand Prix de Wallonie
2018
 4th Trofeo Serra de Tramuntana
 5th Memorial Marco Pantani
 8th Overall Tour of Croatia
 10th Overall Adriatica Ionica Race
 10th Tre Valli Varesine
2019
 6th Trofeo Andratx–Lloseta
 10th Giro dell'Emilia
 Giro d'Italia
Held  after Stage 12
2020
 9th Overall Tirreno–Adriatico
 10th Giro dell'Emilia
2021
 1st  Overall Tour des Alpes-Maritimes et du Var
1st Stage 3
 6th GP Industria & Artigianato di Larciano
2022
 8th Overall Settimana Internazionale di Coppi e Bartali
 9th Overall Tour de l'Ain

Grand Tour general classification results timeline

References

External links

Italian male cyclists
1987 births
Living people
Cyclists from the Province of Lecco
Italian Giro d'Italia stage winners
Italian Vuelta a España stage winners